Filamin-A-interacting protein 1, abbreviated as FILIP1, is a protein that in humans is encoded by the FILIP1 gene.

Interactions
FILIP1 has been shown to interact with Filamin.

References

Further reading